Samuel W. Morris (August 21, 1918 – December 18, 1995) was a former Democratic member of the Pennsylvania House of Representatives.

Career

Samuel Morris served in World War II and saw action in northern France. He was elected to the Pennsylvania State House as a Democrat in a heavily Republican district and always faced well-funded opponents. He was first elected in 1970, and after losing in 1978, was re-elected every election until 1990. His major issues of concern were preservation of the environment, education, and transportation. He was well-respected by both parties for his knowledge and dedication to the people of his district. Morris founded the French and Pickering Creek Trust in 1967. He lost his bid for re-election in 1990 to Jim Gerlach.

References

Democratic Party members of the Pennsylvania House of Representatives
1995 deaths
1918 births
20th-century American politicians
American military personnel of World War II